The 1984 World Junior Curling Championships were held from March 11 to 17 at the Cornwall Civic Complex in Cornwall, Ontario, Canada. The tournament only consisted of a men's event.

Teams

Round robin

  Team to playoffs (final)
  Teams to playoffs (semifinal)

Playoffs

Final standings

Awards
 WJCC Sportsmanship Award:  Al Edwards

All-Star Team:
Skip:  André Flotron
Third:  Andreas Hänni
Second:  Dewey Basley
Lead:  Kelly Vollman

References

External links

World Junior Curling Championships
Curling in Ontario
World Junior Championships
World Junior Curling Championships
Sport in Cornwall, Ontario
International curling competitions hosted by Canada
World Junior Curling Championships
World Junior Curling Championships